Pryde Henry Alipit Teves (born December 18, 1972) is a Filipino politician who served as governor of Negros Oriental from June to October 2022, when the Commission on Elections (COMELEC) annulled his proclamation due to a recount of the May 2022 election. He was the mayor of Bayawan, Negros Oriental from 2016 to 2022, and was the Representative of Negros Oriental's 3rd district from 2007 to 2016. He is a survivor of the 2007 Batasang Pambansa bombing, although both of his eardrums and legs were severely injured.

Political career

Philippine Congress bombing

Congressman Teves was one of the three Philippine representatives, others were Luzviminda Ilagan of GABRIELA partylist and Wahab Akbar of the lone district of Basilan, that were victimized by the explosion. Representative Akbar was killed in the incident while both Teves and Congresswoman Luzviminda Ilagan suffered severe injuries.

About 62% of his body sustained second and third degree burns, and his left foot was badly fractured. In earlier reports, doctors announced that Teves' legs would be amputated, but later decided this would not be necessary. Vercita Garcia, staff member of Rep. Pryde Henry Teves, died at 6:30 p.m. due to cardiac arrest at St. Luke's Medical Center in Quezon City, on December 17, 2007.

On December 18, 2007, after 35 days, Teves was moved out of the intensive care unit of St. Luke's Medical Center to a private room, and recuperated from destroyed eardrum, fractured leg and sustained deep burns in his arms from the Batasang Pambansa bombing.

On January 31, 2008, Teves, 35, reported for work at the House of Representatives, against doctors' advice. Teves, still in a wheelchair, wore black cotton gloves to protect his burned hands, and he could not shake hands or use his cellular phone. He stated:

As provincial governor
In 2022, Teves, ran under Nationalist People's Coalition, defeated incumbent Negros Oriental Governor Roel Degamo with a winning margin of almost twenty thousand votes.

On June 30, 2022, Teves took his oath of office replacing Degamo who had stepped down following a brief standoff as the latter refused to vacate the office.

Invalidation of election

Roel Degamo, who ran for his fourth yet final term after a controversial Commission on Elections (COMELEC) ruling (Degamo had completed three consecutive terms already), had filed a petition before the COMELEC to declare another gubernatorial candidate, a certain Ruel Degamo, whose real name is Grego Gaudia, a nuisance and to cancel the latter's candidacy, which had later decided. He appealed that the votes for Gaudia should be credited to him.

Gaudia filed a motion for reconsideration to contest the ruling of the COMELEC. Pending the commission's ruling by the day of election, his name (Ruel Degamo) remained on the official ballot. On September 1, 2022, his appeal was denied.

The COMELEC en banc, in its ruling with finality dated September 27, credited Gaudia's almost fifty thousand obtained votes to Degamo, thus surpassing that of Teves by almost thirty thousand, which also made the proclamation of Teves to be nullified. Prior to the proclamation of Degamo on October 3, Teves said in his weekend radio program that while respecting whatever decision by either the COMELEC, Supreme Court (SC), or the Department of the Interior and Local Government (DILG) on his election victory, he would not stay further if the ruling in favor of Degamo is enforced.

However, Teves had been refusing to step down despite Degamo's inauguration on October 5 and a DILG order on the same day asking him to vacate the office, saying that the COMELEC decision is final and executory. Teves had filed a quo warranto petition before the SC contesting the said COMELEC ruling, which was expected to be decided by October 11.

Later, on that day, Teves voluntarily relinquished the governorship as the SC, in a media statement, said that they had not act yet on the appeal.

On February 14, 2023, the SC en banc dismissed Teves' petition, thus, affirming the COMELEC's declaration of Degamo's victory.

References

|-

|-

Living people
People from Negros Oriental
Lakas–CMD politicians
Members of the House of Representatives of the Philippines from Negros Oriental
1972 births
De La Salle University alumni